Tocra, Taucheira or  Tukrah, is a town on the coast of the Marj District in the Cyrenaica region of northeastern Libya, founded by Cyrene. It lay 200 stadia west of Ptolemais.

History
Founded by the Greeks and considered by some to be part of the Pentapolis of Cyrenaica, at a later period it became a Roman colony (Tab. Peut.), and was fortified by Justinian I. (Procop. de Aed. vi. 3.) Taucheira was particularly noted for the worship of Cybele, in honour of whom an annual festival was celebrated. (Synes. Ep. 3.)

In the city fortifications from the Hellenistic, Roman and Byzantine periods have been found.

Name
Under the Ptolemies it obtained the name of Arsinoe (Arsinoë), after Arsinoe II of Egypt, named by her brother and husband, Ptolemy Philadelphus. Later it became known as Tocra or Tukrah or Tokara, and then Al Quriyah or El Agouriya in Arabic.

It is the same town erroneously written  by Diodorus (xviii. 20). It is still called Tochira.

Agouriya is the name given to the city by the deposed dictator Muammar Gaddafi, in reference to the Agouri tribe.  The town's largest tribe is the Barghathi tribe, who claim the town their own.  There are tribal rivalries with the Abdali tribe. Both the Barghathi and Abdali tribes belong to the larger "umbrella" Agouri tribe.  The renaming of the town by Gaddafi was to play on the rivalry between the two tribes.  After the 17 Feb revolution, inhabitants of the town went back to the old name, Tokara.

Agriculture
On a relatively small scale, residents of the town grow watermelon, cantaloupe, grapes, almonds, and tomatoes; but it is most famous for its figs.

See also 
 List of cities in Libya

Notes

References

External links 

Cyrenaica
Greek colonies in Libya
Coloniae (Roman)
Former populated places in Libya
Populated coastal places in Libya
Populated places in Marj District
Baladiyat of Libya